Gottfrid Larsson (November 21, 1875 in Vallerstad in Östergötland, Sweden – December 24, 1947 in Stockholm, Sweden) was a Swedish sculptor.

Biography

Julius Gottfrid Andreas Larsson was born in 1875 in Narveryd's farm in Vallerstad in Mjölby Municipality, five-kilometer northeast of Skänninge in Östergötland. His father was the farmer Anders Larsson. At the age of 14 he came to Norrköping in Östergötland where he stayed and worked as a wood carver and studied wood-carving (wood-engraving) at the Technical Evening School in 1889–1895. Then he came to Stockholm in 1895 and studied at the Tekniska skolan in Stockholm or Konstfack (Högre konstindustriella skolan) there in 1895–1899. In 1900 he received a travel grant from the Svenska Slöjdföreningen and Kommerskollegium and then he continued his studies in Paris at Académie Colarossi in Paris in 1900–1902. He assisted in the Royal Dramatic Theatre's decoration in Stockholm (Swedish: Kungliga Dramatiska Teatern or Dramaten in Stockholm), and in 1905 he helped Carl Milles with his work for this theatre. The theatre has been at its present location in the Art Nouveau building at Nybroplan in Stockholm since 1908. Famous artists like Carl Milles and Carl Larsson were involved in making the decorations, and some of the interior decorations were made by Prince Eugen. After that Larsson continued his studies in Munich in 1905–1906 and he spent 1906–1907 in Italy.

Studies in Paris
With the great scholarship from the Royal Swedish Academy of Arts he continued to study in France, and he mostly lived in Paris during the years 1908–1913, with visits to England, Germany, Belgium and the Netherlands. During his time in Paris he got to know some other Swedish artists, who also studied at the Académie Colarossi in Paris. There were, among others, his artist fellows Erik Tryggelin (1878–1962) and David Wallin (1876–1957). They all became friends for life from their time together in Paris. Académie Colarossi was an art school founded by the Italian sculptor Filippo Colarossi. At this time it was located in 10 rue de la Grande-Chaumière in the 7th arrondissement of Paris. During his time in Paris Gottfrid Larsson married the Norwegian woman Karen Sofie Waaler in 1911, and she became Mrs. Karen Larsson.

Foundation of an Art School in Stockholm
From 1913 Larsson was working in Stockholm. In 1920 Gottfrid Larsson founded a painting school together with his art college, the painter and graphic artist Edward Berggren (1876–1961), who had also studied together with him at the Tekniska skolan in Stockholm, now Konstfack (Högre konstindustriella skolan). Both Gottfrid Larsson and Edward Berggren were from Östergötland.

Edward Berggren had studied at the Royal Swedish Academy of Arts in Stockholm during the years 1897–1903. Edward Berggren had been the head of Althins målarskola in Stockholm during the years 1919–1920, and in 1920 Edward Berggren established an own, private art school in Stockholm together with his friend Gottfrid Larsson, Edward Berggrens målarskola (Edward Berggren art school). In 1956 the artist Idun Lovén (1916–1988) took over the school and ran it to 1988. The school is nowadays owned by Konstskolan Idun Lovén AB and since 2004 the school has its place in Årsta, a suburb in Stockholm.

Exhibitions
Gottfrid Larsson participated in exhibitions, among others in Saint Petersburg 1908, Munich 1909 and in San Francisco 1915. In 1935 Gottfrid Larsson had an exhibition in Konstnärshuset, together with the Swedish artist and designer Arthur Percy (1886–1976). Gottfrid Larsson's fellow artist David Wallin arranged some of his exhibitions in Skänninge, an old built-up area from the medieval period, 5 km from Vallerstad in Östergötland, where Gottfrid Larsson was born.

Represented
 Moderna museet in Stockholm.

Works in a Sculpture Museum Studio in Vadstena
In Vadstena, in Skänningegatan 9, there is a sculpture museum called Gottfrid Larsson gården (Gottfrid Larsson garden), where the visitor can get acquainted with his work. After Gottfrid Larsson's death in 1947 his wife Karen Larsson bought the so-called Möllergården in Skänningegatan 9 in Vadstena. In 1953 she donated the whole garden and the sculpture collection, consisting of 125 sculptures, to Vadstena Municipality. In 1979 the garden was opened to the public and Gottfrid Larsson's many works could be exhibited.

Gottfrid Larsson died on Christmas Eve, December 24, 1947, in Stockholm. He is buried in Vallerstad church cemetery, outside the town Skänninge in Östergötland.

Artistic works
Among his early works are:
 Mörkret flyr ljuset (Darkness Flees the Light), (Paris, 1902), an electrical candelabra;
 Kyssen (The Kiss), bronze;
 Toskanska (Tuscany Woman), marble;
 Carl Robert Lamm and his wife Dora Lamm, portrait busts of Carl Robert Lamm (1856–1938) and his wife Dora Lamm, marble;

From Gottfrid Larsson's stay in Italy (1906–1907) and Paris (1908–1912):
 Gammal florentinare (Old man from Florence), marble;
 Florentinskt original (Florence Character), granite;
 Brutal kraft (Brutal Strength), bust, bronze, these were exhibited in 1912;

Other examples of Gottfrid Larsson's sculptures are:
 Vid källan (By the Spring) and other female sculptures in marble;
 Min moder (My mother), marble;
 Oscar Montelius, black granite, Oscar Montelius (1843–1921), a Swedish archaeologist and custodian of national monuments;

Public sculptures to look at today
 Valsverksarbetare (Workers in a Rolling Mill), monumental group, exhibited in 1909 in the competition about industry monument, was placed in Södra folkparken, Stockholm in 1924;
 Valsverksarbetare (Workers in a Rolling Mill) (1910) in Överums Bruk in Kalmar municipality, Småland;
 Arbetaren (The Worker) (1917), bronze statue in Vasaparken, Stockholm;
 Arbetaren (The Worker) (1917), copy in the factory mill park in Lövstabruk, Uppland;
 Man och kvinna (Man and Woman) (1920);
 Sjöjungfru och sjöhästar (Mermaid and Sea Horses) (1920), fountain in Järnvägsparken in Linköping;
 Såningsmannen (The Sower) (1946), at Östgöta nation in Uppsala University;
 Såningsmannen (The Sower) (1949), at Vallerstad church cemetery in Östergötland;
 and moreover there are some portrait busts and decorative sculptures in Norrköping town hall and granite sculpture in Handelsbanken at Drottninggatan and Kungsgatan.

References

Sources
 Gottfrid Larsson i Konstnärslexikonett Amanda
 Gottfrid Larsson in Nordisk Familjebok, Uggleupplagan 37, Supplement L – Riksdag/, sidan 85–86, (1925)
 Gottfrid Larsson i Vem är det, Svensk Biografisk Handbok, 1925, sidan 424–425.
 Gottfrid Larsson i Vem är det, Svensk Biografisk Handbok, 1933, sid 479.
 IDUN, Illustrerad Tidning för Kvinnan och Hemmet, grundad av Frithiof Hellberg, torsdagen den 21 november 1907, 12 pdf-sidor, Kvinnohistoriska tidskrifter, Annie Frykholm om Agda Montelius, Gottfrid Larsson och Otto Strandman med flera.
 Gottfrid Larsson i Ancestry 2008-11-21

External links

 Pictures from Gottfrid Larssongården on page 23 (of 52 pages) Gottfrid Larssongården, Skänningegatan 9, Vadstena, Tidernas landskap, Vadstena Ödeshög 2007, www.tidernaslandskap.se
 Gottfrid Larssongården (Swedish)
 Carl Milles brev till Gottfrid Larsson (Swedish)
 Gottfrid Larssongården, Skulptursamling, Katalog (Swedish)
 Norrköpings rådhus 100 år, 1910–2010, på sidan 11 av 24 sidor, pdf-fil Trapphallen och vestibulen i Norrköpings rådhus. I den stora trapphallens vestibul möter vi två marmorgrupper av bildhuggaren Gottfrid Larsson. Till höger i vestibulen ser vi Klokheten, konstnärens symbol för kommunalförvaltningen, som ursprungligen disponerade rådhusets högra halva, och till vänster Rättvisan, representerande rådhusrätten och polisen i den vänstra halvan av byggnaden.
 Picture of Vallerstad church, Mjölby, Sweden
 Picture of Vallerstad church, Mjölby, Sweden, outside Skänninge
 Svensk konst (Swedish)
 Art Signature Dictionary – Se Gottfrid Larssons signatur

1875 births
1947 deaths
Swedish male sculptors
20th-century sculptors
Académie Colarossi alumni